Michal Daněk (born 6 July 1983) is a Czech former professional footballer who played as a goalkeeper. He works as youth goalkeeper coach of FC Baník Ostrava.

He notably played for Baník Ostrava, whom he has supported throughout his life. Daněk was a member of the squad of Baník Ostrava in the 2003–04 season, when Baník won the league title.

Club career 
In 2006, Daněk joined Viktoria Plzeň. In the 2006–07 Gambrinus liga, Daněk was one of four players in the league to play every minute of every match. Daněk claimed in August 2007 he was to meet Celtic for signing talks.

In January 2008 he linked up with West Bromwich Albion for a few days' training on trial.
He then signed on loan for six months, with a view to a permanent deal. On 31 January 2008, Daněk signed for Albion on loan for the rest of the season.
His loan was extended at the end of the season by six months until 1 January 2009. His loan was terminated on 29 August 2008 without having made a first-team appearance for Albion.

Daněk returned to Viktoria Plzeň afterwards. He won the Czech Cup with the club in 2010. In the same year, he moved to Baník Ostrava on loan.

International career 
He was called up to play internationally for the Czech Republic in March 2010, though he did not play in the match.

Later career 
In the summer 2020, Daněk returned to Baník Ostrava as a goalkeeper coach at the academy and assistant coach of the clubs B-team.

Honours
Viktoria Plzeň
 Czech Cup: 2010

References

External links
 
 
 Michal Daněk player profile at wba.co.uk

1983 births
Living people
Sportspeople from Ostrava
Czech expatriate footballers
Czech footballers
Czech Republic youth international footballers
Czech Republic under-21 international footballers
Czech First League players
Czech National Football League players
FC Baník Ostrava players
FC Viktoria Plzeň players
FK Chmel Blšany players
SK Dynamo České Budějovice players
SK Kladno players
West Bromwich Albion F.C. players
FK Bohemians Prague (Střížkov) players
1. FC Slovácko players
FC Hlučín players
Association football goalkeepers
Czech expatriate sportspeople in England
Expatriate footballers in England